(2 July 1974 – 3 April 2010) was a Japanese rugby player, who played for Japan in three Rugby World Cups from 1999 to 2007.

Career
Watanabe was born in Hokkaido, and joined the team Toshiba Brave Lupus in Tokyo in 1997 after graduating from Nippon Sport Science University. He played 32 times for the national team and in Brave Lupus's hat-trick of Japanese domestic league titles between 2004 and 2006.

Death
On 3 April 2010, Yasunori died at the age of 35, when he fell off a train station platform and was hit by a train at Kamakura Station in Kanagawa Prefecture. An employee at the station saw Watanabe fall at about 9:30 p.m.

References

 The Guardian: "Japan rugby player Yasunori Watanabe killed after being hit by train" (5 April 2010) Retrieved 16 April 2010.  

1974 births
2010 deaths
Japanese rugby union players
Toshiba Brave Lupus Tokyo players
Railway accident deaths in Japan
Japan international rugby union players
Rugby union locks
Rugby union flankers